Arravale (born May 6, 2003 in Kentucky) is an American-bred Thoroughbred racehorse in Canada. Racing at Toronto's Woodbine Racetrack, at age 2 Arravale won two of her first three starts.

She made her first start at age 3 in June 2006, winning the Alywow Stakes at Woodbine. Racing in California, in early July she ran 3rd in the American Oaks at Hollywood Park Racetrack then with new rider Jose Valdivia, Jr. she won the August 19th Grade I Del Mar Oaks at the Del Mar Racetrack. In September's Canadian Stakes at Woodbine Racetrack, Arravale made a late charge but ran out of track and finished second. Back at Woodbine in October, she won her second Grade I event of the year, capturing the $1 million E. P. Taylor Stakes.

Arravale's performance in 2006 earned her Canadian Horse of the Year honours.

References
 Arravale's pedigree and stats
 Arravale Racing Inc, owned by Carolyn Costigan. The company is named after multiple Grade I and horse of the year winner Arravale.

2003 racehorse births
Thoroughbred family 21-a
Racehorses bred in Kentucky
Racehorses trained in Canada
Canadian Thoroughbred Horse of the Year